Ivica Raguž (born 24 June 1968) is a Croatian former footballer who played primarily as a midfielder, where he had a notable run in the S.League.

Playing career 
Raguž played in the National Soccer League in 1991 with Toronto Croatia, where he received the league's MVP award. In 1992, he played with NK Zadar of the Croatian First Football League in 1992. In 1994, he went abroad to play in the American Professional Soccer League with the Toronto Rockets. He made his debut for Toronto on July 27, 1994 against Montreal Impact.

He later played in the newly formed S.League with the Singapore Armed Forces FC, where he formed an instrumental triumvirate with fellow Croatian imports Velimir Crljen, and Jure Ere. In his debut season he was named the Player of the Year. During his tenure with SAFFC he won a league title, Singapore Cup, and the Singapore FA Cup. In 1999, he returned to Croatia to play with NK Slaven Belupo. The following season he had another season in Singapore with Woodlands Wellington FC.

After a brief stint with Woodlands he returned to his former club Zadar for the 2001-02 season. In 2003, he returned to Toronto Croatia to play in the Canadian Professional Soccer League.

References 

1968 births
Living people
Association football midfielders
Croatian footballers
Toronto Croatia players
NK Zadar players
Toronto Rockets players
Warriors FC players
NK Slaven Belupo players
Woodlands Wellington FC players
Canadian National Soccer League players
Croatian Football League players
American Professional Soccer League players
Singapore Premier League players
Canadian Soccer League (1998–present) players
Croatian expatriate footballers
Expatriate soccer players in Canada
Croatian expatriate sportspeople in Canada
Expatriate footballers in Singapore
Croatian expatriate sportspeople in Singapore